Obovaria unicolor is a species of freshwater mussel, an aquatic bivalve mollusk in the family Unionidae, the river mussels. This mussel has a round or elliptical shape.

This species is endemic to the United States.

References

Molluscs of the United States
unicolor
Bivalves described in 1845
Taxonomy articles created by Polbot